Edward Hodgson (1885 – 4 August 1919) was an English professional footballer who played as an inside forward. He originally played non-league football with his hometown club Chorley before joining Second Division side Burnley in 1911 at the age of 25. He won the FA Cup with the club in 1914. Hodgson went on to make 137 appearances for Burnley, scoring 62 goals. He fought in the Manchester Regiment during the First World War, but still represented Burnley as a wartime guest player, scoring 39 goals in 62 matches.

Hodgson contracted a kidney problem while on service and died at Whalley Military Hospital on 4 August 1919.

Honours 
Burnley

 FA Cup: 1913–14

References

Sources

 
 
 

1885 births
1919 deaths
Sportspeople from Chorley
English footballers
Association football inside forwards
Burnley F.C. players
English Football League players
English Football League representative players
British Army personnel of World War I
Manchester Regiment soldiers
Chorley F.C. players
British military personnel killed in World War I
FA Cup Final players